Yau Ma Tei Car Park Building was a public multi-storey car park located at No. 250 Shanghai Street, Yau Ma Tei, Yau Tsim Mong District, Hong Kong. Built in 1970, the building is scheduled for demolition in 2021.

History
The Yau Ma Tei Car Park Building and the nearby Yau Ma Tei Government Office occupy the former site of an old market, after which the adjacent Market Street, considered one of the oldest streets in Kowloon, is named. The market was relocated to the Yau Ma Tei Market, built in 1957 along Kansu Street.

The Yau Ma Tei Car Park Building opened in early 1970. In 1977, the Gascoigne Road Flyover was built to bypass existing surface road and go through the building.

A contract for works including the demolition of the Yau Ma Tei Car Park Building was signed on 6 March 2018 between the Highways Department and Build King-SKEC Joint Venture. The car park was closed in phases starting on 1 November 2020, and finally on 1 January 2021.

Features
The Gascoigne Road Flyover, part of the West Kowloon Corridor, passes through the building.

Yau Ma Tei Car Park has 770 parking spaces for private cars and 76 parking spaces for motorcycles.

The building also houses or has housed government offices and facilities, as well as non governmental offices. They include:
 Yau Ma Tei Public Library on the lower floors
 Government offices on the uppermost storeys
 Hong Kong branch of the United Nations High Commissioner for Refugees. 9th floor.

See also
 Murray Road Multi-storey Car Park Building
 Tsuen Wan Transport Complex

References

Yau Ma Tei
Garages (parking)
Transport infrastructure in Hong Kong
Transport infrastructure completed in 1957
1957 establishments in Hong Kong